Paul Armstrong (born 27 October 1965) is a Scottish retired football forward who played in the Scottish League, most notably for Stirling Albion and Queen's Park.

Career statistics

References 

Scottish footballers
Scottish Football League players
Queen's Park F.C. players
Association football forwards
1965 births
Footballers from Glasgow
Greenock Morton F.C. players
Cork City F.C. players
League of Ireland players
Stirling Albion F.C. players
Living people